The Fife and Tayside Metropolitan Area Network is one of the regional networks that comprise JANET. FaTMAN connects three universities (University of Dundee, University of St Andrews and University of Abertay Dundee) and two colleges (Dundee and Angus College and Fife College) to each other and to the Janet backbone in the east of Scotland. There is also an UoD Fife campus node. The University of Dundee is the Regional Network Operator.

The FaTMAN POPs were replaced by Janet managed POPs in mid 2010.

External links
 Fife and Tayside Metropolitan Area Network 
 History of FaTMAN 

Regional academic computer networks in the United Kingdom
Education in Fife
Education in Dundee
Education in Perth and Kinross
Education in Angus, Scotland
Higher education in Scotland
Internet in Scotland